This is a list of yearly West Virginia Intercollegiate Athletic Conference football standings.

WVIAC standings

References

Standings
West Virginia Intercollegiate Athletic Conference
West Virginia sports-related lists